José Enrique Hertzog Garaizábal (10 November 1897, in La Paz – 31 July 1981, in Buenos Aires) was a Bolivian politician who served as the 42nd president of Bolivia from 1947 to 1949. He resigned in 1949, and died in exile in Argentina.

Biography 
A medical doctor by trade, Hertzog joined the Genuine Republican Party of Daniel Salamanca in the 1920s, and rose to become Minister of Public Information and Communications as well as Minister of War during the 1932–35 Chaco war against Paraguay, which Bolivia lost.

President of Bolivia
In 1947 elections he ran for president on a ticket of united Republican Party (Bolivia) factions (former Saavedrists, Genuines, etc.) calling themselves Republican Socialist Unity Party (Partido de la Unión Republicana Socialista [PURS]). He won against the Liberal leader Fernando Guachalla and the reformist candidate Víctor Paz Estenssoro, who led the Movimiento Nacionalista Revolucionario (Nationalist Revolutionary Movement).

Hertzog faced innumerable obstacles during his term, mostly in the form of constant rebellion from the lower sectors of society, as represented by striking miners and union workers. He was also saddled with the implacable opposition of Paz's MNR party and its allies, in addition to a declining economy. In essence, the attempt of the privileged sectors (led by Hertzog himself) to "turn back the clock" to the oligarchic pre-Chaco War status quo did not work. Rising expectations and demands from an increasingly activist and indeed, violent, popular class, combined with the unwillingness or inability of the governing elites to give concession that would undermine their power, led the country to the very brink of civil war. On 18 September 1947 he declared the state of siege.

Escalating repressive measures, such as arrest and deportation of many MNR leaders, only bred further discontent. When the legislative elections of 1949 confirmed the dramatic ascendancy of the parties of the Left, the PURS leadership lost trust in the relatively more conciliatory Hertzog's ability to control the situation. They forced his resignation for "reasons of (non-existing) illness" in favor of his far more combative vice-president, Mamerto Urriolagoitía.

Later life
A few months later Hertzog was named Bolivia's Ambassador to Spain. Following the 1952 Bolivian National Revolution that brought Paz Estenssoro's MNR party to power, the ex-President remained exiled in the Spanish capital, later moving to Buenos Aires, where he died.

Hertzog again ran for President of Bolivia in 1966 on behalf of remnants of the pre-Revolution parties which had formed Democratic Institutionalist Alliance against René Barrientos, but only got a small share of the vote.

See also 
 Cabinet of Enrique Hertzog

References

Bibliography 
 Mesa José de; Gisbert, Teresa; and Carlos D. Mesa, Historia de Bolivia, 3rd edition., pp. 579–582.

1897 births
1981 deaths
20th-century Bolivian politicians
Ambassadors of Bolivia to Spain
Bolivian expatriates in Argentina
Bolivian expatriates in Spain
Bolivian people of German descent
Bolivian physicians
Candidates in the 1947 Bolivian presidential election
Candidates in the 1966 Bolivian presidential election
Defense ministers of Bolivia
Genuine Republican Party politicians
Government ministers of Bolivia
Higher University of San Andrés alumni
Interior ministers of Bolivia
People from La Paz
Presidents of Bolivia
Republican Socialist Unity Party politicians
Justice ministers of Bolivia